Evardi Boshoff (born ) is a South African rugby union player for the . His regular position is centre.

Boshoff was named in the  squad for the 2021 Currie Cup Premier Division.

References

South African rugby union players
Living people
1998 births
Rugby union centres
Free State Cheetahs players
Leopards (rugby union) players
Cheetahs (rugby union) players
Rugby union players from the Northern Cape